The Hunger Prevention Act of 1988 (P.L. 100-435) amended the Temporary Emergency Food Assistance Act of 1983 (P.L. 98-8) to require the United States Department of Agriculture (USDA) to make additional types of commodities available for the Temporary Emergency Food Assistance Program (TEFAP), to improve the child nutrition and food stamp programs, and to provide other hunger relief.

References 

1988 in law
100th United States Congress
United States federal agriculture legislation
United States federal welfare and public assistance legislation
1988 establishments in the United States